Andrews University Seminary Studies is a biannual peer-reviewed academic journal published by the Seventh-day Adventist Theological Seminary at Andrews University. It was established in 1963 and publishes research articles and brief notes on biblical archaeology and history of antiquity, the Hebrew Bible, New Testament, church history of all periods, historical, biblical, and systematic theology, ethics, history of religion and mission, and Christian ministry and education. The journal is abstracted and indexed in the ATLA Religion Database.

Editors-in-chief
The following persons are or have been editors-in-chief of the journal:
Siegfried H. Horn (1963–1974)
Kenneth A. Strand (1974–1988)
George R. Knight and Kenneth A. Strand (1988–1991)
Nancy J. Vyhmeister and Kenneth A. Strand (1991–1994)
Nancy J. Vyhmeister (1994–2000)
Jerry Moon (2000–2005)
Jerry Moon and John Reeve (2005–2010)
John Reeve (2010–2014)
John Reeve and Martin Hanna (2014–2021)
Oliver Glanz and Martin F. Hanna (2021 - present)

See also

Seventh-day Adventist Church

References

External links
 

Christianity studies journals
Seventh-day Adventist periodicals
Publications established in 1963
Andrews University
Multilingual journals
Biannual journals
1963 establishments in Michigan